Todo el Año (All Year Long) is the third studio album released by Puerto-Rican American performer Obie Bermúdez. It was released by EMI in November 2, 2004. The album was produced by Sebastian Krys and Joel Someillan and earned Bermúdez a Latin Grammy Award for Best Male Pop Vocal Album and garnered a nomination for Album of the Year.

Track listing
This information adapted from Allmusic.

Chart performance

References

2004 albums
Obie Bermúdez albums
Spanish-language albums
Latin Grammy Award for Best Male Pop Vocal Album
Albums produced by Sebastian Krys